Lepidoblepharis grandis is a species of gecko, a lizard in the family Sphaerodactylidae. The species is endemic to Ecuador.

Geographic range
L. grandis is found in Pichincha Province, Ecuador.

Habitat

Description

Reproduction
L. grandis is oviparous.

References

Further reading
Ávila-Pires TCS (2001). "A new species of Lepidoblepharis (Reptilia: Squamata: Gekkonidae) from Ecuador, with a redescription of Lepidoblepharis grandis Miyata, 1985". Occasional Papers of the Sam Noble Oklahoma Museum of Natural History 11: 1–11.
Miyata, Kenneth (1985). "A new Lepidoblepharis from the Pacific slope of the Ecuadorian Andes (Sauria: Gekkonidae)". Herpetologica 41 (2): 121–127. (Lepidoblepharis grandis, new species).

Lepidoblepharis
Reptiles described in 1985
Reptiles of Ecuador
Endemic fauna of Ecuador